The 2019 Herefordshire Council election took place on 2 May 2019 to elect 52 of 53 members of Herefordshire Council in England. The election in Ross North ward was deferred until 6 June 2019 following the death of the UKIP candidate.

Summary

Election result

The election resulted in the Conservative Party losing its majority on the council for the first time since 2007, winning 13 seats. Independents made gains and became the largest group on the council after winning 18 seats, 9 seats short of a majority. The Liberal Democrats and Greens also made gains at the expense of the Conservatives, winning 7 seats each.

|-

Ward results

Arrow

Aylestone Hill

Backbury

Belmont Rural

Birch

Bircher

Bishops Frome & Cradley

Bobblestock

Bromyard Bringsty

Bromyard West

Castle

Central

College

Credenhill

Dinedor Hill

Eign Hill

Golden Valley North

Golden Valley South

Greyfriars

Hagley

Hampton

Hinton & Hunderton

Holmer

Hope End

Kerne Bridge

Kings Acre

Kington

Ledbury North

Ledbury South

Ledbury West

Leominster East

Leominster North & Rural

Leominster South

Leominster West

Llangarron

Mortimer

Newton Farm

Old Gore

Penyard

Queenswood

Red Hill

Ross East

Ross North
The election in Ross North ward was deferred until 6 June 2019 following the death of the UKIP candidate, Gareth Williams. The Liberal Democrats won the postponed election.

Ross West

Saxon Gate

Stoney Street

Sutton Walls

Three Crosses

Tupsley

Weobley

Whitecross

Widemarsh

Wormside

By-elections

Bromyard West

References

2019 English local elections
2019
21st century in Herefordshire
May 2019 events in the United Kingdom